Xiang is the pinyin romanization of the Chinese surnames:  Xiàng and Xiāng. It means “to go forward” 

It originated from several sources. First, from Xiang, an ancient state (located in Shandong province), destroyed in the early Spring
and Autumn period. Secondly from Xiang, an ancient state located in Henan province, which was destroyed in the late Western Zhou dynasty. Thirdly from the first character of the personal name Xiang Fu (向父), the style name of Bi, son of the Duke Huan in the state of Song.

Notable people
 Xiang Hantian (向汉天)
 Xiang Huaqiang, better known as Charles Heung (向華強)
 Xiang Jingyu (向警予)
 Xiang Rong (向榮)
 Xiang Zhongfa (向忠發)
 Xiang Zhejun (向哲浚)
 Ning Xiang (向宁), Chinese American acoustics expert
 Xiang Chong (向寵) general and politician of the state of Shu Han
 Bruce Yu-lin Hsiang (向玉麟; born 1979) better known as Gamerbee, a Taiwanese professional fighting games player
 Jacky Heung Cho (Chinese: 向佐) Hong Kong actor. He is the elder son of Charles Heung

See also
 Xiang
 Xiang Xiu

References

Chinese-language surnames
Individual Chinese surnames